"Somebody Somewhere" is a popular song written by Frank Loesser. The song was published in 1956 as part of Loesser's musical, The Most Happy Fella, where it was introduced by Jo Sullivan Loesser.

Recordings
Doris Day, for the EP Hits from 'The Most Happy Fella''' (1956).
Jo Sullivan Loesser, Original cast recording of The Most Happy Fella, 1956.
Ella Fitzgerald on Ella Sings Broadway, 1963.
Sergio Franchi on 1963 RCA Victor Red Seal album, Broadway, I Love You.
Esther Ofarim on 1965 album Is It Really Me?; now 2006 CD, In New York with Bobby Scott & His Orchestra.
Sophie Hayden, cast recording of Broadway revival of The Most Happy Fella, 1992.
Jo Sullivan Loesser, Emily Loesser, and Don Stephenson on Loesser by Loesser, 1992.
Liz Callaway on Anywhere I Wander: Liz Callaway Sings Frank Loesser, 1993.
Rebecca Kilgore and Dave Frishberg on Why Fight the Feeling: Songs By Frank Loesser'', 2008.

References

Songs written by Frank Loesser
1956 songs